Cataldi is an Italian surname, and may refer to:

 Angelo Cataldi, American radio personality
 Anna Cataldi, Italian humanitarian and journalist
 Annaclara Cataldi Palau, Italian paleographer
 Danilo Cataldi, Italian footballer
 Lee Cataldi, Australian poet
 Marianna Cataldi, Italian singer-songwriter and composer
 Pietro Cataldi, Italian mathematician
 Renato Cataldi, Brazilian painter

Italian-language surnames